Charles Wynne Nicholls (20 October 1831 – 24 January 1903) was an Irish painter of genre, historical subjects and Orientalist scenes.

Life and career
Charles Wynne Nicholls was born into a middle-class family in Dublin on 20 October 1831. His father, John Nicholls, was an apothecary of 48 Dawson Street in Dublin. His mother was Martha Craven.

Nicholls studied art at the Royal Dublin Society's Schools and the Royal Hibernian Academy. He began to exhibit in 1859 as a Member of the Royal Hibernian Academy. He exhibited regularly at the Royal Academy as well. He left Ireland for London in 1864, but continued to exhibit in Dublin for the rest of his life. He lived at 44 Halsey Street in London.

A representative of the Victorian painting genre of portraits and city landscapes, he was a very capable artist. His genre and Oriental scenes were very popular and found a ready market among Victorian art collectors.

He died at his home in London on 24 January 1903.

Work

Select list of paintings
 Tomb of Grace Darling
 Seaside Romance
 What are the wild waves saying?
 Lady in Lilac
 The Light of the Harem 
 The Race between Atlanta and Melanion 
 An Eastern Beauty, 1862
 A Young Woman in Distress Attended by her Maid
 Queen Victoria and Family on Brighton Sands 1860s
 Envious Glances, 1866  Dover Collection
  Courtship on The Beach, 1867 now at Scarborough's Art Gallery.
 The Parting Of Conrad And Medora,
 Loves me, Loves me Not,

See also
 List of Orientalist artists
 Orientalism

References

External links
Nicholls at Wolverhampton Arts and Museums
BBC  UK Art

1831 births
1903 deaths
19th-century Irish painters
20th-century Irish painters
Irish male painters
Orientalist painters
19th-century Irish male artists
20th-century Irish male artists